Hannah Ridge is a narrow, arc-shaped rock ridge,  long, extending westward from Washington Escarpment just north of Brown Ridge, in the Neptune Range of the Pensacola Mountains, Antarctica. It was mapped by the United States Geological Survey from surveys and U.S. Navy air photos, 1956–66, and was named by the Advisory Committee on Antarctic Names for Edward L. Hannah, an aviation structural mechanic at Ellsworth Station, winter 1958.

References

Ridges of Queen Elizabeth Land